There were three processions during the coronation of King George VI. The first saw the King and Queen, members of the royal family, Prime Ministers of the Dominions and the representatives of foreign royalty proceed from Buckingham Palace to Westminster Abbey for the ceremony. Once in the Abbey, the second procession was an element of the ceremony in which court, clerical, governmental, and parliamentary officials from around the Commonwealth of Nations moved in a set order of precedence through the nave and choir and to their seats. After the Coronation, the King and Queen proceeded for the third and last time that day around London's streets as part of a large military parade. The lists below outline the processions forming part of the Coronation of King George VI.

Procession to the abbey

Procession of the King and Queen in the Abbey

Procession from the Abbey to Buckingham Palace

References

Citations

Coronation of George VI and Elizabeth